Historical Records of Australian Science is a biannual peer-reviewed academic journal covering the history of science in Australia and the south-west Pacific and published by CSIRO Publishing on behalf of the Australian Academy of Science. It was established in 1966 as an irregular publication with the title Records of the Australian Academy of Science, obtaining its current name in 1980. Since then, the journal has appeared annually and, since 1991, twice a year.

The editors-in-chief are Sara Maroske (Royal Botanic Gardens Melbourne) and Ian Rae (University of Melbourne).

Abstracting and indexing
The journal is abstracted and indexed in:
Arts & Humanities Citation Index
Current Contents/Arts & Humanities
Chemical Abstracts Service
EBSCO databases
ProQuest databases
Scopus
Social Sciences Citation Index
According to the Journal Citation Reports, the journal has a 2019 impact factor of 0.333.

References

External links

History of science journals
CSIRO Publishing academic journals
Biannual journals
English-language journals
Publications established in 1966
History of science and technology in Australia
Academic journals associated with learned and professional societies of Australia
Historiography of Australia